John Gregg may refer to:

Politicians
John Gregg (Guildford MP) (died 1431 or after), English MP for Guildford
John Gregg (Texas politician) (1828–1864), American politician from Texas who was killed in action during the American Civil War
John R. Gregg (born 1954), American politician from Indiana

Religion
John Gregg (bishop of Cork) (1798–1878), Anglican Bishop of Cork, Cloyne and Ross, 1862–1878
John Gregg (archbishop of Armagh) (1873–1961), Anglican Archbishop of Armagh 1939–1959

Others
John Irvin Gregg (1826–1892), United States Army general
John Robert Gregg (1867–1948), Irish-born American inventor of Gregg shorthand
John P. Gregg (1876–1963), head football coach at Louisiana State University, 1899
John William Gregg (1880–1969), American landscape architect
John Gregg (1899–1986), companion of philanthropist Robert Allerton
John Gregg (baker) (1909–1964), British founder of Greggs bakery
John Gregg (actor) (1939–2021), Australian actor
John Gregg (loyalist) (1957–2003), Ulster loyalist, member of the UDA

See also
John Gregg Fee (1816–1901), founder of Berea College
John Greig (disambiguation)